The AC Indoor Open is an annual indoor track and field competition organized by Athletics Canada. It consists of the Canadian youth and junior national championships and an international open for senior athletes. The inaugural event was held at the Complexe sportif Claude-Robillard in Montreal. The 2022 edition will take place in Saint John, New Brunswick.

See also
Athletics Canada
Sports in Canada
Canadian records in track and field
Canadian Track and Field Championships
Canadian Marathon Championships
Canadian Half Marathon Championships

References

Track and field in Canada